Sidley Austin LLP is an American multinational law firm with approximately 2,000 lawyers in 20 offices worldwide. It is one of the largest law firms in the world by revenue and by profit per partner. The firm's headquarters is at One South Dearborn in Chicago's Loop.  The firm specializes in a variety of areas in both litigation and corporate practices. It is widely considered to be one of the most recognizable and prestigious law firms in the United States. Among its notable alumni are Former President Barack Obama and Former First Lady Michelle Obama.

History

Origins in Chicago 
In 1866, Norman Williams and John L. Thompson founded the law firm of Williams & Thompson in Chicago, Illinois. William Pratt Sidley, who had joined the firm in 1892, was added to the firm’s name in 1900 when it was renamed Holt, Wheeler & Sidley. Edwin C. Austin joined the firm in 1914.

Among the firm's first clients were the Pullman Company, the manufacturer of specialty sleeping railway cars, as well as Western Electric and Illinois Steel.

Other early clients included Western Union Telegraph Company, which moved its Midwest headquarters from Cleveland to Chicago in 1869. After the Great Chicago Fire of 1871, the firm represented numerous insurance companies including Equitable Life Assurance Society. In 1892, William Pratt Sidley joined the firm after having earned an LLB from Union College of Law and a M.A. from Harvard Law School. By 1913, the firm's name was changed to Holt, Cutting & Sidley, although Sidley would be the guiding personality for the Chicago firm through the 20th century. Three years later—the firm then fifty years old—had four partners, four clerks (associates), and ten staff employees with gross income of around $100,000 (roughly $1.9 million in 2008 dollars).

Buffeted by the Great Depression, the firm experienced a dramatic fall in revenues until the New Deal in the 1930s reinvigorated the capital markets. The firm represented Halsey, Stuart & Co., a Chicago-based underwriter in one of the first transactions under the Securities Act of 1933. In 1944, the name was changed to Sidley, Austin, Burgess & Harper and shortened to Sidley & Austin in 1967.

Towards a national firm 

In 1963, former postmaster general J. Edward Day left the administration of President John F. Kennedy to establish the firm's Washington, D.C. office. Initial clients included the Advertising Mail Marketing Association. The DC office later represented the American Medical Association, American Bar Association and the International Minerals & Chemical Corporation. The firm developed strengths in antitrust and the representation of clients in front of the Federal Trade Commission.

Expansion and consolidation 
In 1972, the firm merged with the 50 lawyers of Chicago firm Leibman, Williams, Bennett, Baird & Minow. Additional offices were then established in London, Los Angeles, Singapore and New York. Following the merger, Washington D.C. partner resigned and later sued the firm, In a 1974 lawsuit, Day alleged that the merger represented a "breach of fiduciary duty, breach of contract, fraud and misrepresentation, conspiracy, wrongful dissolution or ouster of co-partner and breach of partnership agreement." The suit was later dismissed with prejudice.

In 2001, the firm merged with Brown & Wood, a New York-based law firm established in 1914 with 400 attorneys and additional domestic offices in Washington, D.C., San Francisco and Los Angeles and overseas branches in London, Beijing and Hong Kong (where it practiced English law in addition to U.S. law). Brown & Wood was known for its securities, structured finance and securitization practices. The firm's well-regarded publication, Accessing the U.S. Capital Markets: An Introduction to United States Securities Law, continues to be updated annually today. Brown & Wood had offices in the World Trade Center. The firm was known as Sidley Austin Brown & Wood until the name was rebranded as Sidley Austin in 2006.

Appellate practice group 
In 1985, U.S. Solicitor General Rex E. Lee founded Sidley Austin's Appellate Practice Group to represent clients in all appellate courts, including the United States Supreme Court, the federal courts of appeals, and state appellate and supreme courts. Following Lee's death, the group was led by Carter Phillips, who has argued more cases before the Supreme Court than any lawyer in private practice and who now chairs the firm's executive committee. The current co-chairs of the practice group are former Acting Attorney General Peter Keisler and former Principal Deputy Associate Attorney General Joseph Guerra.

Involvement in the savings and loan crisis 
Sidley & Austin was among several law firms caught up in the Savings & Loan Crisis and paid $7.5 million to settle legal malpractice claims stemming from its representation of the Lincoln Savings and Loan Association. Such legal work was profiled in the book by Ralph Nader and Wesley J. Smith, No Contest: Corporate Lawyers and the Perversion of Justice in America.

In 2007, Sidley Austin agreed to pay $39 million as part of a settlement with the Internal Revenue Service. The settlement allowed the firm to avoid criminal charges of alleged fraudulent tax shelter activities. The year earlier, Sidley and KPMG agreed to pay $54 million to investors who bought the shelters.

Rankings and recognition 
Sidley Austin is currently the eleventh-largest U.S.-based corporate law firm, with approximately 2,000 lawyers and annual revenues of approximately three billion dollars. The firm is one of the highest-paying companies in the U.S. (with a base salary of $215,000 for first year associates and $415,000 for eighth year associates; equity partners saw a profit per partner of more than $3.0 million in 2020). Sidley currently maintains offices in 20 cities worldwide, with the most recent addition being Munich in 2016.

Sidley has received the most First-Tier National Rankings a total of eight times since the inception of the U.S. News & World Report Best Law Firms Survey in 2010. The 2020 U.S. News Survey also named Sidley as the "Law Firm of the Year" in FDA Law and Securities Litigation. As of 2019, it was the eighth largest law firm in the world (and sixth in the US) by revenue.

The firm frequently appears at the top of various industry rankings. In 2020, the BTI Consulting Group named Sidley to its BTI Client Service A-Team—one of only three law firms to rank in BTI's Client Service Top 30 for 19 consecutive years. The firm earned the top spot in Asset-Backed Alert'''s 2019 league tables for most active underwriter counsel in U.S. asset- and mortgage-backed securitization transactions. Other honors include the American Bar Association's 2019 Champions for Disability Inclusion in the Legal Profession Award, conferred in recognition of the firm's measurable progress in recruiting, retaining, and advancing to leadership lawyers with disabilities, and being named a 2019 "Litigation Department of the Year" finalist by The American Lawyer.

The firm is particularly known for its securities practice and its international trade practice, both of which have consistently ranked first in the respective specialty rankings of Chambers and Partners. The trade group currently represents the Airbus/European Communities side in the ongoing WTO dispute with Boeing/US. The group was named a 2019 International Trade Group of the Year by Law360 and has been honored as "Law Firm of the Year" in Trade & Customs by Who's Who Legal'' for 15 consecutive years. Its appellate and US Supreme Court practice is also particularly well known and has been featured in USA Today, BusinessWeek, the American Lawyer, the Legal Times, and the National Law Journal.[28]

In 2020, Sidley was named "Firm of the Year" in Capital Markets (Overseas); Corporate Compliance; Healthcare, Pharma and Life Sciences; and Real Estate and REIT by China Business Law Journal. In 2018, Sidley was named Competition & Regulatory Team of the Year at The Lawyer Awards in London.

Pro bono work 
Sidley Austin partner George Fatheree worked pro bono on behalf of the descendants of Willa and Charles Bruce to execute the return of beachfront land which had been seized by Los Angeles authorities in the 1920s. The couple had lost the property, known as Bruce’s Beach, when the state claimed it for public use and sold it to private investors. It was officially given back to the couple’s great grandsons, Marcus and Derrick Bruce, on July 20, 2022. The effort involved more than 1,000 hours of pro bono work.

Notable people and alumni 

 Barack Obama, former President of the United States (summer associate in the firm's Chicago office)
 Michelle Obama, former First Lady of the United States
 J. Edward Day, former postmaster general of the United States
 James M. Cole, current partner at the firm; former Deputy Attorney General of the United States and author of the Cole Memorandum
 Joseph D. Kearney, Dean of Marquette University Law School
 Mike Lee, current United States Senator from Utah
 Rex E. Lee, former Solicitor General of the United States and the 10th President of Brigham Young University
 Chris Lu, former United States Deputy Secretary of Labor and current U.S. Ambassador to the United Nations for Management and Reform
 Victor Marrero, Senior United States District Judge of the United States District Court for the Southern District of New York
 Newton N. Minow, former Chair of the Federal Communications Commission during the Kennedy Administration
 Peter Roskam, current partner at the firm; former U.S. Representative for Illinois's 6th congressional district
 Andy Strenio, former member of the Federal Trade Commission
 David S. Tatel, United States Circuit Judge of the United States Court of Appeals for the District of Columbia Circuit
 John D. Zeglis, former Chief Executive Officer of AT&T Wireless
 J. D. Vance, United States junior senator from Ohio

See also 
List of largest United States-based law firms by profits per partner

References

External links 
 Official website
 
 See this firm's profile on Martindale.com

Law firms established in 1866
Law firms based in Chicago
Foreign law firms with offices in Hong Kong
Foreign law firms with offices in Japan
1866 establishments in Illinois